This is a timeline of the Three Kingdoms period (220–280) of Chinese history. In a strict academic sense, the Three Kingdoms period refers to the interval between the founding of the state of Cao Wei (220–266) in 220 and the conquest of the state of Eastern Wu (229–280) by the Western Jin dynasty (265–316) in 280.  However, many Chinese historians and laymen extend the starting point of this period back to the Yellow Turban Rebellion that took place in 184 during the late Eastern Han Dynasty (25–220).

180s

190s

200s

210s

220s

230s

240s

250s

260s

270s

280s

Gallery

References

Bibliography

 

Three kingdoms
China history-related lists
Three Kingdoms
Timelines of Chinese eras and periods